Junta during Spanish American independence was the type of self government as patriotic alternative to the central government of Spain during the first phase of Spanish American wars of independence. The formation of juntas was usually an urban movement. Most juntas were created out of the already-existing ayuntamientos (municipal councils) with the addition of other prominent members of society.

Overview

Juntas emerged in Spanish America as a result of Spain facing a political crisis due to the kidnapping and abdication of Ferdinand VII and Napoleon Bonaparte's invasion. Spanish Americans reacted in much the same way the Peninsular Spanish did, legitimizing their actions through traditional law, which held that there was a retroversion of the sovereignty to the people in the absence of a legitimate king. 

Once adopted the same principle of Popular sovereignty in the Spanish Empire there was a conflict between those who wanted the unity or the independence. The juntas were declared illegal by the governments of Spain. The Spanish government deny him absolutely no legitimacy and fought for preserve the integrity of the Spanish monarchy.  The juntas did not accept the Spanish regency, which was under siege in the city of Cadiz. They also rejected the Spanish Constitution of 1812. 

The juntas in the Americas did not accept the governments of the Europeans, neither the government set up for Spain by the French nor the various Spanish governments set up in response to the French invasion. The majority of Spanish Americans continued to support the idea of maintaining several independent monarchies under Ferdinand VII, but did not support retaining absolutism. In the end, the triumph of the republican ideas such as Bolivar's were imposed over Constitutional monarchy as San Martin's proposed.

Chronology

See also 
Junta (Peninsular War)
Retroversion of the sovereignty to the people
Spanish colonization of the Americas

References 
John Lynch. The Spanish American Revolutions, 1808–1826 (2nd edition). New York, W. W. Norton & Company, 1986. 

Spanish American wars of independence
1810s in the Spanish Empire
Spanish colonization of the Americas